Pilipinas Win Na Win (stylized as Pilipinas Win Na Win!) is a Philippine noontime variety show broadcast by ABS-CBN. It was premiered on July 31, 2010, and aired live weekdays and Saturdays, replacing Wowowee. The show also broadcast worldwide through ABS-CBN's The Filipino Channel.

The show was initially presented by Kris Aquino and Robin Padilla as its main hosts, together with former Wowowee hosts Pokwang, Valerie Concepcion and Mariel Rodriguez. One week after its premiere, Padilla filed leave from the show because of Ramadan and never returned. Rodriguez later left the show and married Padilla. Aquino left as per the decision of the management. It was later presented by The Hitmakers Rico J. Puno, Rey Valera, Marco Sison, and Nonoy Zuñiga, with their co-hosts Pokwang, Valerie Concepcion, and K Brosas. After numerous rumors and speculations of its cancellation, the show ended on December 31, 2010, after five months on air and was replaced by Happy Yipee Yehey!.

Cast

Main Hosts

First season
 Robin Padilla
 Kris Aquino

Second season
 Rico J. Puno†
 Rey Valera
 Nonoy Zuñiga
 Marco Sison

Co-hosts
 Pokwang (July 31 – December 31, 2010)
 Valerie Concepcion (July 31 – December 31, 2010)
 Mariel Rodriguez (July 31 – August 16, 2010)
 Pooh (August 10 – October 2, 2010)
 Chokoleit† (August 23 – September 23, 2010)
 Janelle Jamer (October 4 – November 12, 2010)
 Gazelle "Speedy Gee" Canlas (October 4 – November 12, 2010)
 K Brosas (October 27 – December 31, 2010)

Featuring
 Bentong (July 31, 2010 – December 31, 2010)
 DJ Ace (July 31, 2010 – December 31, 2010)
 Saicy Aguila (July 31, 2010 – December 31, 2010)
 Win na Win Dancers (July 31, 2010 – December 31, 2010)
 Lassie (September 15 – October 2, 2010)
 Atak Arana (September 16 – October 2, 2010)

History 
Pilipinas Win Na Win premiered July 31, 2010, as a response of Willie Revillame's indefinite leave from Wowowee and the controversial row between him and Jobert Sucaldito. The main hosts were Robin Padilla and Kris Aquino.  Most of the new show's staff and dancers came from its displaced predecessor.

A week later after the premiere, Padilla took an indefinite leave because of Ramadan, but was not planning to come back.  His co-host Mariel Rodriguez also followed suit.  More co-hosts were introduced after, and a new trend of comedians hosted including Jason Gainza, Pooh, and Chokoleit.

Some of "Pilipinas Win na Win"'s staff (led by Jay Montelibano) and dancers also soon left the show to join Willie Revillame's new production company, Wil Productions Inc. (now WBR Entertainment Productions Inc.) on August 9, 2010, after he declared in a press conference that he had unilaterally ended his contract with ABS-CBN.  Suffering a plague of low ratings since launch, ABS-CBN asked Kris mid-September for her to leave the show, and so she quietly left the show without any goodbyes on September 30, 2010. Two days later on October 2, ABS-CBN officially announced four new hosts and two new co-hosts. The four hosts tagged as the "hitmakers" include Rico J. Puno, Rey Valera, Marco Sison, and Nonoy Zuniga. The two new co-hosts include one of the three original co-hosts of Wowowee, Janelle Jamer, and a newcomer: Gazelle "Speedy Gee" Canlas of Music Uplate Live. The six new hosts with the current hosts started hosting October 4, 2010. On October 9, 2010, the "hitmaker" hosts celebrated their first week hosting Pilipinas Win Na Win. The opening featured the hosts singing "Baby", and each host sung their own popular OPM song. Later, their co-hosts Pokwang, Valerie Concepcion, Janelle Jamer, and "Speedy Gee" gave them a certificate to congratulate their first week on the show. On November 6, 2010, the "hitmakers" celebrated their first month hosting the show.

Cancellation
After a battle of constant low ratings and many alternate time slots, Pilipinas Win Na Win ended on December 31, 2010, during the New Year celebration. The cancellation was announced by Rico J. Puno several times during the December 20 episode. Rumors of this issue were around entertainment websites from interviews of a fellow co-host, Valerie Concepcion before the network announced its cancellation. Rumors were also about the show's replacement, a Philippine version of The Price Is Right hosted by the original host of Pilipinas Win Na Win, Kris Aquino. Its time slot was occupied by Showtime and Malparida. On February 12, 2011, a new noontime show was aired called "Happy Yipee Yehey!" and yet cancelled due to its low ratings on February 4, 2012.

Segments

Final segments

Sa Araw ng Pasko, Hiling Mo... Tutuparin ko
Sa Araw ng Pasko, Hiling Mo... Tutuparin Ko (lit. On Christmas Day, Your Wish... I'll Grant) is a segment in which children can SMS their wishes for the upcoming Christmas holiday. It also features the child's heartwarming story. Some of the prizes given on the segment are a Noche Buena package, and groceries for the whole family. On December 19, the segment was expanded from Saturday to daily.

Hulihin ang Bituin, Kampihan Kapamilya
Aired Saturdays and pre-taped in barangays, fifty contestants battle out in mini-games for P100,000. There are six types of mini-games whether it is simply correctly identifying a played song, or taking part in a physical dare. After the cancellation of Pilipinas Win na Win, this segment was carried over to Showtime.

Ang Theme Song ng Buhay Mo
Every weekdays, Ang Theme Song ng Buhay Mo (lit. The Theme Song of Your Life) features various contestants that share their heart-felt stories about their personal lives of love, hate, etc. The hosts will sing a song relating to their lives, and the contestant receives P5,000. The most popular contestant chosen by the audience will advance to Gulong ng Premyo.

Gulong ng Premyo
In the Gulong ng Premyo (lit. Prize Wheel) segment, the winner of Ang Theme Song ng Buhay Mo gets to spin a wheel that has a different money amounts from P5,000 to P50,000. The space landed on the wheel will be the prize won. As always, the home partner will receive the same amount and three random studio audience member(s) will receive the same winnings with the player's winnings divided by three.

OMG! Ano Ito?
Twenty-five texters, and twenty-five audience members have a chance to play OMG! Ano Ito? (lit. OMG! What's This?). One contestant chosen by random draw goes on to play to the jackpot round.

Forty-five seconds will be given to the contestant to guess as much guesses as possible for the P1,000,000 mystery capsule. The more guesses, the better chances of winning. At the second part of the jackpot round, audience members will reveal their guesses, and the contestant can choose five of the audience's guesses. The audience member chosen will win P1,000 for their item being chosen, and will win P10,000 if their guess was exact. The ten guesses that are the potential capsule items will be revealed. One by one, the contestant will remove an item they think is not in the capsule. Each item that is correctly not in the capsule is worth P20,000. The contestant can walk away at any time. If a contestant is not certain of choosing an item, the computer can remove one item in exchange of removing P100,000 from the jackpot. When the contestant reaches three items on the list, the contestant has one final guess or a walk away. If they are risked to guess, he/she must risk all their earnings. If the contestant guesses correctly, the contestant wins the jackpot prize. At any point of the game, if the contestant removes the mystery item from the list, the contestant loses all their winnings, but still has the guaranteed P10,000.

Discontinued segments

Awards and nominations
 25th PMPC Star Awards For TV (Best Variety Show) - Nominated

See also 
 List of programs previously aired by ABS-CBN
 Wowowee
 Happy Yipee Yehey!
 It's Showtime

References

External links

2010 Philippine television series debuts
2010 Philippine television series endings
ABS-CBN original programming
Philippine variety television shows
Filipino-language television shows